Michael Atchia is a Mauritian academician. He is the former chief and programme director with the United Nations Environment Programme. He is a pioneering specialist in the field of sustainable development and has worked internationally in educational reform, international and regional environmental project management and conflict resolution, environmental education and curriculum development. As international consultant he has undertaken numerous consultancies in more than 50 countries and has worked with organizations such as UNESCO, World Health Organization, UNDP, ILO, GTZ/DSE of Germany and the British Council.

Awards
In 1990 he received the "Tree of Learning Award" of the IUCN for 20 years significant contribution to conservation education and in 1996 the "Environmental Leadership Award" from the East African Environment Network.
In 2012 he received an honorary Doctor of Science (D.Sc) from the University of Salford, Salford, UK, in recognition for "his outstanding contributions to science".

1938 births
Living people
Alumni of the University of Salford
Mauritian civil servants
Mauritian scientists